The first commercial bank in Western Australia was created eight years after the establishment of the Swan River Colony in 1829.

Entries in italics indicate a locally (W.A.) domiciled operation.

Notes

External links
https://web.archive.org/web/20060503170654/http://www.encyclopedia.uwapress.uwa.edu.au/wa_snapshots#b
http://www.gabr.net.au/biogs/ABE0187b.htm#related

Banking in Western Australia, Timeline of
Western Australia, Timeline of banking in
Banking in Western Australia, Timeline of
Australia, Western, Timeline of banking in
Banking in Western Australia, Timeline of
Financial history of Australia